Mesophleps crocina is a moth of the family Gelechiidae. It is found in Australia (South Australia, Victoria).

The wingspan is 12–16 mm. The ground colour of the forewings is pale yellow, overlaid with ochreous brown scales.

The larvae feed on Acacia species. They feed on the seeds of their host plant. Pupation takes place in a silk-lined cell within the seed pod.

References

Moths described in 1904
Mesophleps